Ashland Community Hospital may refer to one of the following hospitals in the United States:

Ashland Community Hospital (Kentucky), see List of hospitals in Kentucky
Ashland Community Hospital (Oregon)